Theophilus Yakubu Danjuma  (born 9 December 1938) is a politician and retired Nigerian army lieutenant general who played a key role in post independence military and political events in Nigeria. Danjuma amassed an enormous fortune through shipping and petroleum.

He was Chief of Army Staff from July 1975 to October 1979. He was also Minister of Defence under President Olusegun Obasanjo's administration.

Early life 
Danjuma was born in Takum, Taraba State (formally Gongola), Nigeria to Kuru Danjuma and Rufkatu Asibi. Takum was mainly a farming community when Danjuma was young, and yams, rice, cassava, and beniseed were cultivated largely by families and clans in the community. His father was a hardworking peasant whose ancestors were all highly respected members of the community. Kuru Danjuma was a farmer who also traded in metal parts for farming implements and tools.

Theophilus Danjuma started his education at St Bartholomew's Primary School in Wusasa and moved on to the Benue Provincial Secondary School in Katsina-Ala where he was the captain of the school cricket 1st XI team; he received his Higher School Certificate in 1958. In 1959 Danjuma enrolled at the Nigerian College of Arts, Science, and Technology in Zaria (Ahmadu Bello University) to study history on a Northern Nigeria Scholarship. However, by the end of 1960, Danjuma had left the university to enroll in the Nigerian Army.

Military career 
Danjuma was commissioned into the Nigerian Army as second lieutenant and platoon commander in the Congo. In 1963, he joined a UN Peace-keeping force in Sante, Katanga Province in Congo, he was promoted to the position of a captain three years later. In 1966, Captain Danjuma was involved in the counter-coup with the 4th Battalion in Mokola, Ibadan General Johnson Aguiyi-Ironsi was arrested in Ibadan, together with his host General Adekunle Fajuyi, by northern soldiers under the command of Major Theophilus Danjuma (as he then was). Both men were then whisked away and taken to a road side bush where they were both stripped naked and shot.

In 1967, he was promoted to lieutenant colonel at the start of the civil war campaign towards Enugu, which was captured later that year. In December 1967, he was appointed Commander of the Nigerian Army's 1st Infantry Brigade, a position he held till July 1968. Towards the end of the Nigerian Civil War, Danjuma led a battalion that freed Jaja Wachuku, first Speaker of the Nigerian House of Representatives as well as first Ambassador to the United Nations and first Foreign Affairs Minister, from detention by the Ojukwu government.

In 1970, Danjuma attended the International Court Martial in Trinidad and Tobago as Nigeria's representative, where he was appointed president of the tribunal in a case brought against members of a failed coup attempt in Trinidad and Tobago. Following his promotion to Colonel in 1971 he spent next two years with responsibility for court-martialling Army officers proven guilty of corruption and indiscipline. In 1975 he was promoted to Brigadier and the position of General Officer Commanding (GOC), and in the following year he became the Chief of Army Staff to the Head of State Olusegun Obasanjo. He played a prominent role in supporting the president in resisting the Dimka Coup in 1976. He retired from the Nigerian army in 1979.

Later career

Business
Formed in 1979 by General TY Danjuma (Rtd), Nigeria American Line (NAL) began business and initially leased a ship called 'Hannatu' which traded between Lagos and Santos in Brazil when Nigeria's bilateral trade agreement had opened the sea routes to economies in the South American markets. NAL went on to win patronage from Nigeria's National Supply Company (NNSC) to bring in government goods . NAL's list of growing clients included DICON Salt (Nigeria), project cargoes for Iwopin Paper Mill, ANNAMCO and Volkswagen Nigeria.
NAL became a member of AWAFC (American West African Freight Conference), Brazil-Nigeria Freight Conference and the Mediterranean Line (MEWAC). With the formation of the National Maritime Authority (NMA) IN 1987/88, the profile of NAL increased as NMA encouraged indigenous operators to claim their share of internationally traded cargo involving Nigeria. 
NAL began with a core indigenous staff of about 12 in 1979. In 2009, staff in NAL-COMET were closer to 250 including approximately 12 expatriate staff members. From the Lagos office the NAL-COMET Group has opened branch offices in Port Harcourt which serves Onne, Warri and Calabar seaports.

COMET Shipping Agencies Nigeria Limited was established in 1984 by Danjuma, primarily to act as an agent for Nigeria American Line (NAL). COMET has grown and by the late nineties became one of the largest independent agents operating in Nigeria with experience in handling many types of vessels and cargo. In 2009 Comet handled over 200 vessels at the ports of Lagos, Port Harcourt, Calabar and Warri. In 2005 NAL-COMET acquired a roll-in-roll-out port (RORO) in Lagos which makes it the largest independent port operators in Africa.

South Atlantic Petroleum (SAPETRO) is a Nigerian oil exploration and production company that was created in 1995 by General T. Y. Danjuma. The ministry of Petroleum Resources in Nigeria awarded the Oil Prospecting License (OPL) 246 to SAPETRO in February 1998. SAPETRO partnered with Total Upstream Nigeria Ltd (TUPNI) and Brasoil Oil Services Company Nigeria Ltd (Petrobras) to start prospecting on OPL246. 
Akpo, a condensate field was discovered in April 2000 with the drilling of the first exploration well (Akpo 1) on the block. Other discoveries made on OPL 246 include the Egina Main, Egina South, Preowei and Kuro (Kuro was suspended as a dry gas/minor oil discovery).
In 2004, SAPETRO's subsidiary in Benin won through a competitive tender process an oil exploration contract covering 550 square kilometres offshore from the Republic of Benin.
In February 2005, SAPETRO was granted Oil Mining Lease (OML) 130 and thereafter the Federal government backed in through the Nigerian National Petroleum Corporation (NNPC). In June 2006, SAPETRO divested part of its contractor rights and obligations to China National Offshore Oil Corporation (CNOOC). SAPETRO produced its "first oil" (condensate) on 4 March 2009.
In December 2009 SAPETRO donated a new state of the art medical centre to the Nasarawa State University. The medical centre, to be known as South Atlantic Petroleum Medical Centre would be available to serve the University, the local and neighbouring communities.

NatCom Development & Investment Limited
Nigerian business tycoon, Gen. TY Danjuma, was named Board Chairman by the NatCom Development & Investment Limited "NatCom", trading as ntel. The announcement was made on Wednesday, July, 2016 following General Danjuma's inaugural board meeting. ntel commenced commercial operations of its 4G/LTE-Advanced network on 08-04-16 in Lagos and Abuja. ntel is Nigeria's most advanced mobile 4G/LTE network providing superfast Internet Access that enables high-definition voice, data and video services. ntel's network is built on the 900/1800 MHz frequency bands which are the best propagation frequencies for the deployment of 4G/LTE technology. ntel's bouquet of services includes: National Bandwidth; International Voice Termination, International Bandwidth; Mobile and Fixed Communications services.

The company made its first on-net test data call in Lagos on Monday, January 18, 2016 and followed this with its first on-net Voice-over-LTE (VoLTE) call in Lagos on Thursday, February 25, 2016. Commercial operations commenced on Friday April 8, 2016.

Politics 
Since 1999 Danjuma has played an active role in Nigerian politics, some of his key appointments have been:

 1999 Appointed as Minister of Defence to President Olusegun Obasanjo's Cabinet
 2003 Appointed as Chairperson for investigative committee on the Warri conflict
 2010 Nominated as Chairman of the Presidential Advisory Council by Acting President Goodluck Jonathan

While in Office, Gen TY Danjuma sought to curb the politicisation of the military, and was a firm supporter of democracy and the Rule of Law. He also oversaw the renaming of all Nigerian barracks and cantons from those of civilian or living persons. He was also widely known to be an avid opponent of President Obasanjo's attempts in 2006 to engineer a way that would enable himself and state governors to serve more than two consecutive terms.

Danjuma serves as Chairman of the Victims' Support Fund Committee, supporting the victims of terror such as the Chibok schoolgirls kidnapping. On 16 July 2014, in a speech at the Presidential Villa in Abuja, Danjuma "told President Jonathan that Boko Haram insurgents appear to be having the upper hand, as they choose where to strike and capture territory ... Danjuma said the battle to win the insurgency war has already taken too long."

Philanthropy 
In December 2008, the TY Danjuma Foundation was created in Nigeria.

The Foundation's principal aims are to provide durable advantages through the implementation of development programs.
The Foundation plans to operate more as a philanthropic organisation rather than simply as a charity. This would allow for the foundation to seek out other deserving causes and Non Governmental Organizations (NGOs) to partner with and make grants available.

The TY Danjuma Foundation seeks to alleviate poverty in communities by providing basic amenities, education for children and young adults while also providing free medical care for indigent people. 
Currently, US$500,000 has been given out as grants to NGOs working to relieve suffering in Danjuma's home state of Taraba. Taraba is historically one of Nigeria's most impoverished states, compounded by the absence of a health service which catered for the masses. Furthermore, the state has the highest case of river blindness and other debilitating illnesses.
 
The TY Danjuma Foundation is currently partnering with over 50 NGOs throughout Nigeria, and with the support and co-operation of 36 state governors. One of the many NGOs which is being supported by the Foundation is CASVI working in Takum, Wukari and Donga. CASVI's main area of expertise is on the provision of free eye care services such as the treatment of river blindness in Wukari, Ibi and Donga.

See also 
 Caroline Danjuma

References

Further reading 
 Barrett, Lindsay. (1979). Danjuma, the Making of a General (biography; Enugu, Nigeria: Fourth Dimension).

Living people
1938 births
Defence ministers of Nigeria
Nigerian Army officers
Participants in the 1966 Nigerian counter-coup
Participants in the 1976 Nigerian military coup
Participants of coups in Nigeria
People from Taraba State
20th-century Nigerian businesspeople
21st-century Nigerian businesspeople
Nigerian philanthropists
People of the Congo Crisis
Theophilus
Chiefs of Army Staff (Nigeria)